Raja Yong Sofia binti Almarhum Sultan Azlan Muhibbuddin Shah Al-Maghfur-lah (born 24 June 1961) is the fifth child of the Sultan of Perak, Sultan Azlan Shah. She holds a master's degree in Administration from International University in London. She worked for Bank Bumiputra.

Biography

Wedding 
She married at Kuala Kangsar, on 5 December 1987, Y.M. Tunku Dato' Sri Kamil bin Tunku Rijaludin (of Kedah, born in 1952).

He is son of Tunku Rijaludin bin Tunku Muhammad (of Kedah), a first cousin of the late Sultan Abdul Halim of Kedah, and his first wife, Raja Nur Azian binti Raja Harun Al-Rashid (of Perak), daughter of Raja Haji Harun al-Rashid of Perak, Raja Kechil Sulong, himself son of Sultan Sultan Idris Shah I of Perak, who is also Raja Yong Sofia's ancestor.

Childhood 
Raja Yong Sofia was born at Penang, Malaya, 24 June 1961 as the fifth child of late Sultan Azlan Muhibbuddin Shah ibni Almarhum Sultan Yussuff Izzuddin Shah Ghafarullahu-lah, later Sultan Azlan Shah of Perak, and his wife Tuanku Bainun Binti Mohd Ali (herself a member of the Royal House of Perak and much fifth granddaughter of her husband's father Sultan Yussuff Izzuddin Shah of Perak)

Her siblings are :
 brother Raja Nazrin Shah (born 27 November 1956)
 sister Raja Azureen (born 9 December 1957)
 brother Raja Ashman Shah (born 28 December 1958 died 30 March 2012)
 sister Raja Eleena (born 3 April 1960)

Descent 
She has one son : 
 Tunku Aznal Shahabudin bin Tunku Kamil (of Kedah).

Family link of the spouses 
Kamil of Kedah and Sultan Azlan of Perak (Yong Sofia's father) are second cousins :

 Sultan Sir Idris Murshid al-Azzam Shah GCMG,  GCVO (1887–1916) -- Marhum Rahmatu'llah , né Y.A.M. Raja Idris [Dris], Raja Muda.
 Sultan ‘Abdu’l Jalil Nasir ud-din Muhtaram KCMG, OBE ( – 20 January 1916 - November 1918)  -- Marhum Radziallah 
 H.R.H. Sultan Yusuf Izz ud-din Rathiu’llah KCMG (15 January 1890 – 29 March 1948 – 4 January 1963) -- Marhum Ghafarullah.
 H.R.H. Sultan ‘Azlan Muhib ud-din Shah GCB, KStJ  (19 April 1928 – 3 February 1984 – 29 May 2014 ). 
  Y.A.M. Raja Datuk Sri Yong Sofia, SPCM (19.4.1989), born 24 June 1961 
  Y.A.M. Raja Haji Harun al-Rashid, Raja Kechil Sulong (1882 - 10 May 1945) 
 Y.M. Raja Nor Azian (of Perak) married Tunku Rijal ud-din bin Tunku Muhammad (of Kedah)
  Y.M. Tunku Dato’ Sri Kamil (of Kedah), SPCM (19.4.1989),  born 1953.
  Y.M. Tunku Aznal Shahabudin bin Tunku Kamil (of Kedah)

Honours

Honours of Raja Yong Sofia  
She has been awarded:

Honours of Perak 
  Member Second Class of the Azlan Royal Family Order (DKA II)
  Grand Knight of the Order of Cura Si Manja Kini (the Perak Sword of State, SPCM, 19 April 1989) with title Dato' Seri 
 current ribbon of the decoration :

Honours of Tunku Kamil of Kedah  
He has been awarded:

Honours of Perak 
  Member Second Class of the Azlan Royal Family Order (DKA II)
  Grand Knight of the Order of Cura Si Manja Kini (the Perak Sword of State, SPCM, 19 April 1989) with title Dato' Seri 
 current ribbon of the decoration :

Ancestry

References

1965 births
People from Penang
Royal House of Perak
Living people
Malaysian people of Malay descent
Malaysian Muslims
Daughters of monarchs